Eastern Lakes State was a state in South Sudan that existed between 2 October 2015 and 22 February 2020. It was located in the Bahr el Ghazal region and it bordered Southern Liech to the north, Western States to the west, Amadi to the southwest, Terekeka to the southeast, and Jonglei to the east.

History
On 2 October 2015, President Salva Kiir issued a decree establishing 28 states in place of the 10 constitutionally established states. The decree established the new states largely along ethnic lines. A number of opposition parties and civil society groups challenged the constitutionality of the decree. Kiir later resolved to take it to parliament for approval as a constitutional amendment. In November the South Sudanese parliament empowered President Kiir to create new states.

Rin Tuec was appointed Governor on 24 December.

Geography

Administrative divisions
After the split up, Eastern Lakes State broke down even further for a total of 8 counties in the state; later 11 and recently 15. The 15 counties are part of the 180 counties in South Sudan. The 15 counties are consisted of the following:

 Former Yirol South County:
 Awerial Centre; headquarters: Awerial
 Awerial East; headquarters: Abuyung
 Awerial North; headquarters: Buna-gok
 Awerial South; headquarters: Guol-yar (Mingkaman)
 Former Yirol East County:
 Adior; headquarters: Adior
 Lou; headquarters: Nyang
 Malek; headquarters: Malek
 Yali; headquarters: Yali
 Former Yirol West County:
 Abang; headquarters: Abang
 Aluakluak; headquarters: Aluakluak
 Anuol; headquarters: Anuol
 Geer; headquarters: Geer
 Madbar; headquarters: Madbar
 Ngop; headquarters: Ngop
 Yirol Centre; headquarters: Yirol Centre

The counties are further sub-divided into payams, and the payams are then further sub-divided into bomas.

List of governors of Eastern Lakes State
The governors of Eastern Lakes State in the order of first to last are the following:
 Rin Tueny Mabor
 Bor Wutcok Bor
 Mangar Buong Aluenge

References

Bahr el Ghazal
States of South Sudan